Ottoman Macedonia may refer to:

 The region of Macedonia when ruled by the Ottoman Empire from the 14th to early 20th century
 Salonica vilayet, administrative division of the Ottoman Empire from 1867 to 1912 covering southern and eastern parts of the region
 Manastir vilayet, administrative division from 1874 to 1877 covering western parts of the region of Macedonia
 Kosovo vilayet, administrative division from 1878 until 1909 covering some northern parts of the region of Macedonia
 , for history of Ottoman rule on the territory of present-day Greek Macedonia
 North Macedonia under the Ottoman Empire, for history of Ottoman rule on the territory of present-day North Macedonia

See also 
 , demographic history of the region of Macedonia under the Ottoman Empire
 Slavic speakers in Ottoman Macedonia, a Slavic ethnolinguistic groups in Ottoman Macedonia
 Pirin Macedonia, part of the geographical region Macedonia formerly within Ottoman Bulgaria
 Macedonia (disambiguation)
 Macedonia (terminology)